Joanne Katz is an epidemiologist, biostatistician, and Professor of International Health at the Johns Hopkins Bloomberg School of Public Health. She holds joint appointments in the Departments of Biostatistics, Epidemiology and Ophthalmology (School of Medicine). Her expertise is in maternal, neonatal, and child health. She has contributed to the design, conduct and analysis of data from large community based intervention trials on nutritional and other interventions in Indonesia, Philippines, Bangladesh, Nepal and other countries.

Early life and education
Joanne Katz was born in Cape Town, South Africa. Her father Robert Katz was a builder of large apartment buildings across Cape Town and holder of several patents in Africa and Europe on innovative designs and construction methods using poured concrete technologies. Her mother, Rachel (Ray) Katz , a lawyer, was one of the first women admitted to the South African bar. Katz was the second of four children. The family immigrated to the United States in 1978 just after Katz graduated with a Bachelor of Science in economics and statistics from the University of Cape Town.

She received a Master of Science in mathematical statistics from Princeton University in 1982 and immediately joined the faculty of the newly established Dana Center in the Johns Hopkins Department of Ophthalmology as a research associate. While working full time, Dr Katz earned a Doctor of Science in international health from Johns Hopkins Bloomberg School of Public Health in 1993. Her dissertation was titled Village and household clustering of morbidity and mortality in developing countries.

Career
From 1982 to 1994, Katz served on the faculty of the Dana Center for Preventive Ophthalmology in the Wilmer Eye Institute at Johns Hopkins. With an MS degree, she was promoted to assistant professor in 1986 and to associate professor in 1991. In 1994, she moved with several colleagues into the Johns Hopkins Bloomberg School of Public Health Department of International Health. There, she was promoted to professor in 1997.

Research
Katz has contributed to the research and the diagnosis of eye disease, specifically to underserved children and elderly in Baltimore.

Her research has also sought to find low cost interventions to reduce micronutrient deficiencies, infectious diseases, and poor reproductive outcomes among pregnant women, adolescents, and young children in Africa and Asia. Starting in 1982, as a statistician, she worked with Alfred Sommer to analyze data to uncover a link between vitamin A deficiency (VAD) and an increased risk for child mortality.

From 1983 to 1992, Katz worked with Keith West and James Tielch to run a number of large scale, community-based, randomized trials to identify a link between VAD and child mortality. Their work showed they could reduce child mortality in at-risk populations by 23 to 34%. They conducted a number of randomized trials in Indonesia and Nepal in the 1980s. By 1992, the World Health Organization, UNICEF, the United Nations's Food and Agriculture Organization, and the Convention on the Rights of the Child declared the control of VAD as a common goal.

Katz worked with Dr. Alfred Sommer, Center director to understand the causes of xerophthalmia, respiratory and diarrheal infections in several countries in South Asia.

Awards
 1993 Delta Omega Public Health Honor Society
 2016, Maryland Women's Hall of Fame inductee
 2018 Ernest Lyman Stebbins Medal for extraordinary contributions to the educational programs of the Johns Hopkins Bloomberg School of Public Health
 2019, 2011 Golden Apple teaching Award, Johns Hopkins Bloomberg School of Public Health

Select publications

References

Living people
People from Cape Town
University of Cape Town alumni
Princeton University alumni
Johns Hopkins Bloomberg School of Public Health alumni
Johns Hopkins Bloomberg School of Public Health faculty
American women epidemiologists
American epidemiologists
American ophthalmologists
Women ophthalmologists
Biostatisticians
Year of birth missing (living people)
21st-century American women